Colesburg is a city in Delaware County, Iowa, United States. The population was 386 at the time of the 2020 census.

History
Colesburg was laid out in 1848. The town was named for founders Hiram Cole and James Cole.

Geography
Colesburg is located at  (42.639999, -91.201246) near the Little Turkey River.

Demographics

2010 census
As of the census of 2010, there were 404 people, 187 households, and 128 families living in the city. The racial makeup of the city was 98.0% White, 1.0% Asian, and 1.0% from two or more races.

There were 187 households, of which 25.7% had children under the age of 18 living with them, 52.9% were married couples living together, 11.8% had a female householder with no husband present, 3.7% had a male householder with no wife present, and 31.6% were non-families. 29.4% of all households were made up of individuals, and 11.8% had someone living alone who was 65 years of age or older. The average household size was 2.16 and the average family size was 2.61.

The median age in the city was 48.9 years. 19.3% of residents were under the age of 18; 4.4% were between the ages of 18 and 24; 21.1% were from 25 to 44; 30.7% were from 45 to 64; and 24.5% were 65 years of age or older. The gender makeup of the city was 48.3% male and 51.7% female.

2000 census
As of the census of 2000, there were 412 people, 185 households, and 123 families living in the city. The racial makeup of the city was 100.00% White.

There were 185 households, out of which 24.3% had children under the age of 18 living with them, 60.0% were married couples living together, 4.9% had a female householder with no husband present, and 33.5% were non-families. 33.5% of all households were made up of individuals, and 21.6% had someone living alone who was 65 years of age or older. The average household size was 2.23 and the average family size was 2.81.

In the city, the population was spread out, with 20.1% under the age of 18, 5.3% from 18 to 24, 23.1% from 25 to 44, 26.2% from 45 to 64, and 25.2% who were 65 years of age or older. The median age was 46 years. For every 100 females, there were 88.1 males. For every 100 females age 18 and over, there were 84.8 males.

The median income for a household in the city was $33,068, and the median income for a family was $41,750. Males had a median income of $31,667 versus $17,396 for females. The per capita income for the city was $16,638. About 4.6% of families and 5.2% of the population were below the poverty line, including 1.1% of those under age 18 and 11.1% of those age 65 or over.

Education
Edgewood–Colesburg Community School District operates public schools.

References

Cities in Iowa
Cities in Delaware County, Iowa
1848 establishments in Iowa
Populated places established in 1848